Wan Junaidi bin Tuanku Jaafar (Jawi: وان جنيدي بن توانكو جعفر; born 1 February 1945) is a Malaysian politician who served as Minister in the Prime Minister's Department for Parliament and Law from 2021 to 2022. He was the Member of Parliament for Santubong from 2004 to 2022, having previously been MP for Batang Lupar from 1990 to 2004.

Wan Junaidi served in the Muhyiddin government as Minister of Entrepreneur Development and Co-operatives from 2020 to 2021. Under Najib Razak, he served as Minister of Natural Resources and Environment from 2015 to 2018. He was the Deputy Minister of Home Affairs under Abdullah Ahmad Badawi and Najib from 2013 to 2015. He also served as Deputy Speaker of the Dewan Rakyat, alongside Ronald Kiandee, from 2008 to 2013.

Wan Junaidi is a member of Parti Pesaka Bumiputera Bersatu (PBB), a component party of the Gabungan Parti Sarawak (GPS) coalition.

Early career
He has been a police officer in Royal Malaysia Police (RMP) with the rank of Inspector of the General Operations Force (GOF). He had ever fought the communist between 1969 and 1973. Next after he stopped serving in the force, he became a lawyer. He also became President of Sarawak Ex-Police Association of Malaysia (PBPM) of Sarawak.

Political career
In the 1990 general election, he first contested in the Batang Lupar  parliamentary seat and won. He managed to retain the seat in 1995 and 1999 general elections.

In the 2004 general election, he switched seats with Rohani Abdul Karim, contesting the Santubong parliamentary seat and won. He managed to retain the seat in 2008, 2013 and 2018 general elections.

On 28 April 2008, he was elected as one of the Parliament's Deputy Speakers and served for one term.

On 16 May 2013, he was appointed as Deputy Minister of Home Affairs. During his tenure as Deputy Minister at the Ministry of Home Affairs, he controversially attributed a high rate in statutory rape cases among Malays to Malays community being "culturally more sensitive" about their youth thus reporting more cases than "non-Malays" who may more accepting of the statutory rape.

On 29 July 2015, he was appointed as Minister of Natural Resources and Environment following a Cabinet reshuffling by the Prime Minister, Najib Razak.

Writing results
 Evolusi parlimen dan evolusi speker parlimen Malaysia; DBP, 2010.	 
 Falsafah moral ilmu berpengakap; DBP, 2007.

Election results

Honours

Honours of Malaysia
  :
  Companion of the Order of Loyalty to the Crown of Malaysia (JSM) (2000)
  Commander of the Order of Meritorious Service (PJN) – Datuk (2003)
  :
  Grand Commander of the Exalted Order of Malacca (DGSM) – Datuk Seri (2017)
  :
  Knight Commander of the Order of the Star of Sarawak (PNBS) – Dato' Sri (2014)

References 

Living people
1945 births
People from Sarawak
People from Kuching
Malaysian Muslims
Malaysian people of Malay descent
Malaysian police officers
20th-century Malaysian lawyers
Parti Pesaka Bumiputera Bersatu politicians
Members of the Dewan Rakyat
Government ministers of Malaysia
Commanders of the Order of Meritorious Service
Companions of the Order of Loyalty to the Crown of Malaysia
Knights Commander of the Most Exalted Order of the Star of Sarawak
20th-century Malaysian politicians
21st-century Malaysian politicians